Mayfield East is a suburb of Newcastle, New South Wales, Australia, located  from Newcastle's central business district. It is part of the City of Newcastle local government area.

History 
The Aboriginal people, in this area, the Awabakal, were the first people of this land.

Education 
On 32 Crebert Street there is co ed government primary school called Mayfield East Public School

References

Suburbs of Newcastle, New South Wales